Lake Proserpine is a rural locality in the Whitsunday Region, Queensland, Australia.

Geography
The locality completely surrounds the body of water retained by the Peter Faust Dam on the Proserpine River, which is known as Lake Proserpine.

References 

Whitsunday Region
Localities in Queensland